Arthur Lees (1908–1992) was an English golfer.

Arthur Lees may also refer to:

Arthur Lees (rugby) (1874–?), English rugby union and rugby league footballer who played in the 1890s and 1900s
Sir Arthur Lees, 5th Baronet (1863–1949), of the Lees baronets

See also
Arthur Lee (disambiguation)